In Riemannian geometry, a branch of mathematics, the prescribed scalar curvature problem is as follows: given a closed, smooth manifold M and a smooth, real-valued function ƒ on M, construct a Riemannian metric on M whose scalar curvature equals ƒ.  Due primarily to the work of J. Kazdan and F. Warner in the 1970s, this problem is well understood.

The solution in higher dimensions 
If the dimension of M is three or greater, then any smooth function ƒ which takes on a negative value somewhere is the scalar curvature of some Riemannian metric.  The assumption that ƒ be negative somewhere is needed in general, since not all manifolds admit metrics which have strictly positive scalar curvature.  (For example, the three-dimensional torus is such a manifold.)  However, Kazdan and Warner proved that if M does admit some metric with strictly positive scalar curvature, then any smooth function ƒ is the scalar curvature of some Riemannian metric.

See also 
 Prescribed Ricci curvature problem
 Yamabe problem

References
Aubin, Thierry. Some nonlinear problems in Riemannian geometry.  Springer Monographs in Mathematics, 1998.
Kazdan, J., and Warner F. Scalar curvature and conformal deformation of Riemannian structure. Journal of Differential Geometry. 10 (1975). 113–134.

Riemannian geometry
Mathematical problems
Scalar curvature